The 7th Parliament of Zimbabwe was a meeting of the Zimbabwean Parliament, composed of the Senate and the House of Assembly. It met in Harare over five sessions from 25 August 2008 to 27 June 2013. Its membership was set by the disputed 2008 Zimbabwean general election, which resulted in a ZANU–PF majority in the Senate and Movement for Democratic Change – Tsvangirai control of the House of Assembly. Political negotiations resulted in the 2009 Government of National Unity, a coalition government composed of ZANU–PF, the MDC–T, and the MDC–M.

Overview

Convening of Parliament
On 19 August 2008, President Robert Mugabe announced his intention to open Parliament in the subsequent week, five months after the parliamentary election was held. Due to ongoing negotiations over the disputed election, the opposition Movement for Democratic Change – Tsvangirai party saw this as unacceptable, with MDC–T Secretary-General Tendai Biti stating that it would "be a clear repudiation of the Memorandum of Understanding, and an indication beyond reasonable doubt of ZANU–PF's unwillingness to continue to be part of the talks. In short, convening Parliament decapitates the dialogue."

Nevertheless, Parliament was convened on 25 August 2008. That morning, Mugabe appointed 11 senators, including eight of the ten seats reserved for provincial governors and three of the five special non-constituency Senate seats. Chris Mushohwe was appointed Resident Minister and Governor for Manicaland Province, Ephraim Masawi for Mashonaland Central, Aeneas Chigwedere for Mashonaland East, and Faber Chidarikire for Mashonaland West. The remaining Resident Ministers and Governors—Cain Mathema for Bulawayo, David Karimanzira for Harare, Thokozile Mathuthu for Matabeleland North, and Angeline Masuku for Matabeleland South—were reappointed to their posts. (Mugabe did not appoint governors for Midlands and Masvingo provinces at that time.) The three non-constituency senators appointed that day were Vice-President Joseph Msika, Patrick Chinamasa, and John Nkomo, who was Speaker of Parliament during the preceding parliamentary term. Mugabe was believed to have left some of the posts vacant so that they could go to the MDC in the event of a power-sharing agreement.

Despite the MDC–T's objections, the members of Parliament were sworn in on the morning of 25 August. The MDC MPs sat on the government benches and told the ZANU–PF MPs to sit on the opposition benches. Also on 25 August, two MDC–T MPs, Shuwa Mudiwa and Eliah Jembere, were arrested. Mudiwa was released later in the day and was sworn in as an MP. Wayne Bvudzijena, a police spokesman, said that the police questioned Mudiwa with regard to political violence, while Jembere was being held over rape charges. Five other MDC MPs were also wanted by the police. The MDC–T denounced the arrests as politically motivated and said that the police had entered Parliament and forcefully removed Mudiwa from the building. It also claimed that another of its MPs was targeted for arrest but that this arrest was prevented by other MDC MPs; however, according to the MDC, a third MP was arrested at his home the next day.

Mugabe opened Parliament with a speech on 26 August, expressing an optimistic outlook on resolving the political dispute—"Landmark agreements have been concluded, with every expectation that everyone will sign up"—while denouncing the West's policies toward Zimbabwe. MDC MPs heckled him during his speech; although Mugabe continued speaking and completed it, he was reportedly inaudible at times due to the volume of the heckling, "look[ed] annoyed", and spoke more loudly and quickly as a result. In a petition on the same day, the MDC condemned the convening of Parliament as a violation of the preliminary agreement between the parties regarding negotiations, described Mugabe as an "illegitimate usurper", and criticized the arrest of the MDC MPs. The state-owned newspaper The Herald strongly criticized the heckling in an editorial, describing it as "disgraceful" and "infantile", while also asserting that the MDC–T had effectively acknowledged Mugabe's legitimacy by attending Parliament and remaining there during Mugabe's speech.

Election of speakers
Parliament was convened at 10 a.m. on 25 August 2008 by Clerk of Parliament Austin Zvoma, though Mudiwa and Jembere had been arrested prior to the ceremony. Mudiwa was later released and sworn into office, but Jembere remained in police custody. In addition, the MDC announced that 15 of its members would not attend the ceremony because they were hiding from intimidation and violence.

After the members of Parliament were sworn in, elections were held that day for the leadership of both houses of Parliament. In the House of Assembly, a secret-ballot election of the Speaker pitted Lovemore Moyo (MDC–T) against Paul Temba Nyathi (MDC–M); ZANU–PF declined to field a candidate against the two, opting to back the MDC–M candidate instead. Moyo won the election with 110 votes against Nyathi's 98. The Deputy Speaker, Nomalanga Khumalo (MDC–M) was also elected. Moyo reportedly received 99 votes from MDC–T MPs, seven votes from MDC–M MPs, and four votes from ZANU–PF MPs, but the breakdown of results could not be known for certain because the vote was secret. Independent MP Jonathan Moyo also backed Nyathi.

ZANU–PF's Emmerson Mnangagwa described Moyo's election as "a truly historic event" and expressed his congratulations on behalf of Mugabe and the party. Following his election as Speaker, Moyo predicted that Parliament would henceforth be a meaningful check on the executive, which would need to "find ways of negotiating with the legislature in order to put through programs". In the Speaker election, a number of the MDC–M MPs voted against their own party's candidate for Speaker, which was considered a blow to Mugabe, because it meant that he could not rely on MDC–M MPs to vote with ZANU–PF. Thus, ZANU–PF would likely be unable to control a parliamentary majority despite the support of the MDC–M leadership.

In the Senate, where ZANU–PF held a majority, ZANU–PF candidate Edna Madzongwe was reelected President of the Senate with 58 votes. Gibson Sibanda, whose candidacy was supported by both the MDC–T and the MDC–M, received 28 votes.

Temporary adjournment and power-sharing agreement
On 24 October, it was announced that Parliament would be adjourned until 11 November due to a lack of funds from the government.

Parliament planned to meet again in October 2008, at which point it would consider proposed constitutional amendments resulting from the power-sharing agreement between ZANU–PF and the MDC, which was signed in September. As the terms of the deal were supported by all three parties, the amendments were expected to pass without difficulty. Elements of the agreement specifically relevant to Parliament included granting all three parties the right to appoint one minister who is not a Member of Parliament. These ministers would be allowed to participate in Parliament, but would not have voting rights. Additionally, the agreement provided for the appointment of nine more non-constituency senators, three from each party.

Party summary

Senate

House of Assembly

Members

References

2008 establishments in Zimbabwe
2013 disestablishments in Zimbabwe
2008 Zimbabwean general election
Zimbabwean parliaments